Major General Llewelyn Alberic Emilius Price-Davies,  (30 June 1878 – 26 December 1965) was a senior British Army officer and a recipient of the Victoria Cross, the highest award for gallantry in the face of the enemy that can be awarded to British and Commonwealth forces.

Early life
Price-Davies was born at Chirbury, Shropshire, in 1878, third son of Lewis Richard Price of Marrington Hall. The Davies family were of Welsh descent with an unbroken male line to the 13th-century noble Cynric Efell, Lord of Eglwys Egle.

Military career
Price-Davies was commissioned a second lieutenant in The King's Royal Rifle Corps on 23 February 1898. He was promoted to lieutenant on 21 October 1899, and seconded for service in South Africa during the Second Boer War.

Price-Davies was 23 years old, and a lieutenant in The King's Royal Rifle Corps during the Second Boer War when the following deed took place at Blood River Poort for which he was awarded the Victoria Cross:

Price-Davies was promoted to captain in his regiment on 7 January 1902, while still seconded with Mounted Infantry in South Africa. He stayed there until after the end of the war, leaving Cape Town on the SS Orient in October 1902.

Price-Davies later achieved the rank of major general. His grave and memorial are at St Andrew's churchyard in Sonning, Berkshire. His Victoria Cross is displayed at the Royal Green Jackets (Rifles) Museum in Winchester, England.

References

External links
 Service record
 Location of grave and VC medal (Berkshire)
 angloboerwar.com
 

1878 births
1965 deaths
Burials in Berkshire
English people of Welsh descent
People educated at Marlborough College
Graduates of the Royal Military College, Sandhurst
King's Royal Rifle Corps officers
British Army personnel of World War I
Second Boer War recipients of the Victoria Cross
British recipients of the Victoria Cross
Companions of the Order of the Bath
Companions of the Order of St Michael and St George
Companions of the Distinguished Service Order
British Army personnel of the Second Boer War
British Home Guard officers
Chevaliers of the Légion d'honneur
Honourable Corps of Gentlemen at Arms
British Army generals
British Army recipients of the Victoria Cross
Military personnel from Shropshire